30th meridian may refer to:

30th meridian east, a line of longitude east of the Greenwich Meridian
30th meridian west, a line of longitude west of the Greenwich Meridian